Ronyell Whitaker (born March 19, 1979) is a former professional American football cornerback. He was signed by the NFL's Tampa Bay Buccaneers as an undrafted free agent in 2003, and played for the Minnesota Vikings, the Detroit Lions and the CFL's Winnipeg Blue Bombers before retiring from professional football in 2009.

Early years
Ronyell Deshawn Whitaker was born March 19, 1979, in Norfolk, Virginia, the son of Sylvonia Whitaker and the nephew of boxer Pernell 'Sweet Pea' Whitaker.

He graduated from Norfolk's Lake Taylor High School, where he "lettered four years as a running back, defensive back and return man"; he scored 44 touchdowns and ran for 3,458 yards.

Whitaker played college football at Virginia Tech, where he was "rated the No. 8 cornerback in the nation by The Sporting News [and] ranked the No. 10 cornerback by Lindy's."

Professional career
In 2006, he led NFL Europe in interceptions and defensive touchdowns, with 141 return yards and two touchdowns, and was named to the All NFL Europe team.  In one of his games in the NFLE in 2006, his 100-yard interception return for a score was his team's sole touchdown of the game.  On November 6, 2007, the Vikings released him.

Whitaker spent a brief stint with the Detroit Lions (NFL) before being released just before the beginning of 2008-2009 season.  Whitaker then signed with the Winnipeg Blue Bombers of the Canadian Football League. He was released on June 25, 2009.

Career after football
, Whitaker is back in Minnesota, living with his wife and working as part of a Minneapolis–Saint Paul area real estate team, specializing in relocation transactions for the Vikings, as well as short sales.

References

1979 births
Living people
American football cornerbacks
American players of Canadian football
Canadian football defensive backs
Virginia Tech Hokies football players
Tampa Bay Buccaneers players
Minnesota Vikings players
Rhein Fire players
Detroit Lions players
Winnipeg Blue Bombers players